Man of Letters may refer to:

 Man of letters
 Man of Letters (film), a 1984 television film